Major Edward Tempest Tunstall North JP (31 January 1900 – 1 January 1942) was a  British Conservative Party politician. He was the Member of Parliament (MP) for Nuneaton in Warwickshire from 1931 until 1935. He was killed in action in 1942, aged 41.

Background

Edward North was the son of Brigadier-General Bordrigge North North, CB MVO JP DL (1862–1936) and his wife Maud Mabella North (née Coulthurst) of Carnforth. He was born at Newton Hall, Kirkby Lonsdale, Westmorland. He was educated at Eton and Trinity College, Cambridge, to which he was admitted as a Pensioner in 1919. In 1928, he married Mary Scott Wilkinson, daughter of T.W. Wilkinson of Carnforth. He had a son named Richard. In 1935, he was living at The Ridding, Bentham, Yorkshire.

Parliamentary career

At the 1931 election, he was selected as the Conservative candidate for the seat of Nuneaton in Warwickshire. Following a strong swing to the Conservatives, he unseated the sitting Labour MP, Frank Smith with a majority of 2,464. He did not contest the seat in 1935, when it was lost back to the Labour candidate, Reginald Fletcher.

Military career

During the Second World War, North served as a Major in the Royal Armoured Corps, Yorkshire Hussars. He died on 1 January 1942. He is buried in the churchyard of St John the Baptist church, Tunstall, Lancashire.

References

External links
 

1900 births
1942 deaths
Military personnel from Westmorland
Burials in Lancashire
Conservative Party (UK) MPs for English constituencies
UK MPs 1931–1935
British Army personnel killed in World War II
People educated at Eton College
Royal Armoured Corps officers
Yorkshire Hussars officers
People from South Lakeland District